Elections to Norwich City Council took place on 3 May 2012, the same day as other 2012 United Kingdom local elections. Fifteen out of thirty-nine council seats were up for election and the Labour Party gained control of the council from No Overall Control.

The Green Party held firm, while the Liberal Democrats and Conservatives suffered losses.

The Liberal Democrats lost their last seat in Lakenham to Labour, meaning that they now only held seats in the affluent Eaton ward.  Former Liberal Democrat Group leader, Judith Lubbock held Eaton convincingly.

After the election, the composition of the council was as follows:
Labour 21 (+3)
Green 15 (no change)
Liberal Democrat 3 (-1)
Conservative 0 (-2)

All changes in vote share are calculated with reference to the 2008 election, the last time these seats were contested.

Election result

|-bgcolor=#F6F6F6
| colspan=2 style="text-align: right; margin-right: 1em" | Total
| style="text-align: right;" | 15
| colspan=4 style="text-align: right;" |Turnout
| style="text-align: right;" | 31.7%
| style="text-align: right;" | 32,416
| style="text-align: right;" | 
|-
|}

Council Composition

Prior to the election the composition of the council was:

After the election, the composition of the council was:

Ward results

Bowthorpe

Catton Grove

Crome

Eaton

Lakenham

Mancroft

Mile Cross

Nelson

Sewell

Thorpe Hamlet

Town Close

University

Wensum

References

2012 English local elections
2012
2010s in Norfolk